The 1982 Guam legislative election was held in Guam on November 2, 1982. The Democratic Party won fourteen of the twenty-one seats in the Legislature.

Results

Legislature

Primary Election
The primary election is scheduled for the first Saturday in September. For the 1982 election, the primary was held on Saturday, September 4, 1982 for both the Democratic Party of Guam and the Republican Party of Guam. The 21 at-large candidates from each party who receive the most votes go on to the general election.

Candidates

Democratic

Republican

Results

Democratic

Republican

General election
The general election is scheduled for the first Tuesday following the first Monday in November. For the 1982 election, the general election was held on Tuesday, November 2, 1982. The 21 at-large candidates who receive the most votes would be certified and then inaugurated as members of the 17th Guam Legislature on January 3, 1983.

Candidates

Democratic

Republican

Results

Incoming Senators to the 17th Guam Legislature
There were 21 senators elected on November 2, 1982 to serve in the 17th Guam Legislature:

Democratic

Incumbents

Freshmen

Republican

Incumbents

Freshmen

References

1982 elections in the United States
1982 in Guam
Legislative elections in Guam